Sphyrarhynchus is a monotypic genus of flowering plants from the orchid family, Orchidaceae. The sole species is Sphyrarhynchus schliebenii, endemic to Tanzania.

See also 
 List of Orchidaceae genera

References

External links 

IOSPE orchid photos, Sphyrarhynchus schliebenii Mansf. 1935 Photos courtesy of Margaret Dunseath
Flickr photo, Sphyrarhynchus schliebenii
African Orchids

Monotypic Epidendroideae genera
Vandeae genera
Angraecinae
Flora of Tanzania
Orchids of Africa